State Route 200 (SR 200) is a secondary south-north state road located in West Tennessee.

Route description

SR 200 starts at SR 365 in Henderson in Chester County as Steed Street. It continues into rural Chester County as Mifflin Road where it crosses the South Fork of the Forked Deer River and then passes through unincorporated Mifflin, where it intersects SR 197. After passing through Mifflin it becomes known Garner Town Road and passes into Henderson County. It then passes through unincorporated Garner Town and then becomes known as Life Road before terminating in Lexington at SR 22A. SR 200 is, for the most part, a narrow winding road that runs mainly through farm land and rural residential areas.

Major intersections

References

200